The Rand Mountains are located in the Mojave Desert northeast of California City and southwest of the town of Randsburg.

History
The mountains were the location of the Rand Mining District, with the mining towns of Randsburg, Red Mountain, and Johannesburg, now approaching ghost town status.

Geography
The mountains lie in a southwest-northeasterly direction at the eastern edge of the Fremont Valley.  The Scodie Mountains and the Sierra Nevada are to the west.  The range stretches approximately 15 miles from the Desert Tortoise Natural Area to the old mining areas of Randsburg.

The principal peaks of the range are Government Peak, at 4,741 feet, and Sidney Peak, at 4,372 feet above sea level. The Rand Mountains receive very little rainfall in a normal year, typically less than seven inches.

See also
Burro Schmidt Tunnel
Category: Mountain ranges of the Mojave Desert

References

California Road and Recreation Atlas, 2005, pg.94

Mountain ranges of the Mojave Desert
Mountain ranges of Kern County, California
Mining in California
Mountain ranges of Southern California